Carl Frank Fischer (year of birth unknown – 1893) was a New Zealand doctor, homoeopath and viticulturist. He was born in Germany.

Further reading 
 Gluckman, L. K. 'Dr Carl Fischer MD and the history of homoeopathy in Auckland in the 19th century'. New Zealand Medical Journal 90 (1979): pages 66–69
 Gluckman, L. K. 'Dr Carl Frank Fischer MD, an early Auckland physician, botanist and viticulturalist'. Auckland—Waikato Historical Journal No 37 (Sept. 1980): pages 18–20

References

1893 deaths
New Zealand homeopaths
German homeopaths
German emigrants to New Zealand
Year of birth unknown